The 2011 Tevlin Women's Challenger was a professional tennis tournament played on indoor hard courts. It was the 7th edition of the tournament and part of the 2011 ITF Women's Circuit, offering a total of $50,000 in prize money. It took place in Toronto, Ontario, Canada between October 31 and November 6, 2011.

Singles main-draw entrants

Seeds

1 Rankings are as of October 24, 2011

Other entrants
The following players received wildcards into the singles main draw:
 Elisabeth Abanda
 Gabriela Dabrowski
 Erin Routliffe
 Kimberley-Ann Surin

The following players received entry from the qualifying draw:
 Maria Abramović
 Diana Ospina
 Amra Sadiković
 Carol Zhao

The following players received entry as lucky losers:
 Céline Cattaneo
 Nika Kukharchuk
 Eleanor Peters

Champions

Singles

 Amra Sadiković def.  Gabriela Dabrowski, 6–4, 6–2

Doubles

 Gabriela Dabrowski /  Marie-Ève Pelletier def.  Tímea Babos /  Jessica Pegula, 7–5, 6–7(5–7), [10–4]

External links
Official website

Tevlin Women's Challenger
Tevlin Women's Challenger
Tevlin Women's Challenger
Tevlin Women's Challenger
Tevlin Women's Challenger